PADI AWARE Foundation is an environmental nonprofit organization with three registered charities in the United Kingdom, United States, and Australia. Their mission is to drive local action for global ocean conservation. They advance their mission by engaging an international community of both professional and recreational scuba divers via the Professional Association of Diving Instructors (PADI).

Background
In 1989, the Professional Association of Diving Instructors (PADI) established the Project AWARE Foundation as a commitment to ocean protection. In 1992, Project AWARE Foundation became a registered nonprofit organization with an environmental mission and purpose. In 2021, Project AWARE evolved into PADI AWARE Foundation to more formally join PADI on a joint conservation plan and overall environmental vision.

Activities
PADI AWARE Foundation manages four evergreen programs through public funding: marine debris, shark protection, community grants and Marine Protected Areas (MPAs). These programs provide tools and resources to engage the public, and scuba divers in activities such as citizen science, education, advocacy (letter writing campaigns, petitions and photo campaigns) to advance more significant action on the key threats facing the ocean.  

In 2011, the organization announced a focus on the removal of marine debris, encouraging volunteer divers from around the world to actively remove trash from the seafloor. This program established the organization's flagship citizen science program, Dive Against Debris, and has created the largest underwater citizen science program and movement on the planet with over 100,000 divers reporting from 117 countries. In 2020, PADI AWARE Foundation published the data, in collaboration with Ocean Conservancy, in Science Direct.

Shark and ray protection, critical species to shark tourism, are a core policy focus of the organization. In 2021, the Foundation rallied divers to advocate for protections for Mako Sharks. Alongside shark partners and allies, the Foundation pressured governments to adopt a ban on the catching of vulnerable species. 

In 2021, PADI AWARE Foundation committed to the PADI Blueprint for Ocean Action, joining the United Nations’ universal call for a Decade of Action to achieve the Sustainable Development Goals (SDGs), specifically supporting the implementation of SDG14 – Life Below Water. To advance this commitment, the organization launched the PADI AWARE Community Grant Program and the Adopt the Blue program, both underpinning their Marine Protected Areas work. 

PADI AWARE engages a dedicated community of dive leaders and ocean advocates via an online eco-network, an interactive conservation map, conservation dive courses, letter-writing campaigns, and joining environmental NGO networks to give collective support to member organizations' lobbying efforts.  They also work in partnership with PADI dive shops who commit financial support through the 100% AWARE partnership where dive professionals support ocean protection with each student they certify through PADI.

References

External links
PADI AWARE Foundation website
PADI AWARE page on LinkedIn

Non-profit organizations based in California
Organizations established in 1989
International environmental organizations
Diving organizations
Marine conservation organizations